SRF Tagesschau ( "View on the Day"), simply titled Tagesschau until 4 December 2005, is the title of a current-affairs show on German-speaking Swiss public channel SRF 1. The main edition is broadcast at 7:30 pm and further editions are shown around noon and at the end of daily broadcasting. In 1990, another news show called 10vor10 ("10 to 10") was added, as well as Schweiz aktuell for regional information.

External links 
Official website

Swiss television shows
Current affairs shows
German-language television shows
1953 Swiss television series debuts
1950s Swiss television series
1960s Swiss television series
1970s Swiss television series
1980s Swiss television series
1990s Swiss television series
2000s Swiss television series
2010s Swiss television series
2020s Swiss television series
Schweizer Radio und Fernsehen original programming